Boreocomitas oregonensis is an extinct species of sea snail, a marine gastropod mollusc in the family Pseudomelatomidae.

Distribution
Fossils of this marine species were found in Oligocene strata in Oregon, USA.

References

External links
 Hickman C.S. (1976). Bathyal gastropods of the family Turridae in the early Oligocene Keasey Formation in Oregon, with a review of some deep-water genera in the Paleogene of the eastern Pacific. Bulletins of American Paleontology. 70(292): 1-119

Pseudomelatomidae
Oligocene gastropods